Ammonius is a masculine given name which may refer to:

 Ammonius Lithotomos (3rd century BC), Alexandrian Greek lithotomist
 Ammonius of Athens (1st century AD), philosopher and teacher of Plutarch
 Ammonius Saccas (3rd century AD), Alexandrian Neoplatonist philosopher and teacher of Plotinus
 Ammonius of Alexandria (Christian philosopher) (3rd century AD), Christian writer confused with Ammonius Saccas
 Ammonius the Hermit, called Saint Amun, 4th century abbot and desert father
 Ammonius Grammaticus, Egyptian priest from Alexandria, supposed author of a grammatical treatise
 Ammonius Hermiae (5th century AD), Alexandrian philosopher
 Ammonius (Alexandrian monk) ( 5th century AD)